Orgando dos Santos Paquete (born 15 July 1992), better known as Gando is São Toméan footballer who plays for UDRA in São Tomé and Príncipe Championship as a midfielder. He was called to São Tomé and Príncipe national football team at the 2014 FIFA World Cup qualification, where he appeared in two games against the Republic of Congo, scoring one goal.

International career

International goals
Scores and results list Congo's goal tally first.

References 

1992 births
Living people
São Tomé and Príncipe footballers
Association football midfielders
São Tomé and Príncipe international footballers
UDRA players